Lois McCallin (born c. 1956) holds the world record distance and endurance for female human powered flight.

On January 21, 1987 McCallin, an amateur triathlete flew 15.44 kilometers in 37 minutes, 38 seconds in the MIT Daedalus project's human-powered Michelob Light Eagle aircraft at Roger Dry lake, Edwards Air Force Base, California.  For this achievement, she was awarded the Harmon Trophy.

References
 "List of records established by 'Lois McCallin'" Fédération Aéronautique Internationale
 Mathews, Jay (23 January 1987) "Distance Record Set for Human-Powered Flight" Washington Post p. A20

1958 births
Living people
American aviators
Harmon Trophy winners
American aviation record holders
American women aviation record holders
21st-century American women